John Lynch (10 April 1889 – 10 June 1957) was an Irish Fine Gael politician who served as a Senator for the Industrial and Commercial Panel from 1954 to 1957 and a Teachta Dála (TD) for the Kerry North constituency from 1951 to 1954.

Lynch was elected to Dáil Éireann on his first attempt, at the 1951 general election, as a Fine Gael candidate for the Kerry North constituency taking his seat in the 14th Dáil.

At the 1954 general election, he lost his seat to the Clann na Poblachta candidate Johnny Connor, but was then elected to the 8th Seanad on the Industrial and Commercial Panel, where he served until 1957.

He stood again as a candidate for Dáil Éireann at the 1957 general election, but was unsuccessful. Clann na Poblachta had not put forward a candidate, and the seat was won by a Fianna Fáil candidate, Daniel Moloney. Lynch did not contest the subsequent election to the 9th Seanad, and died in June 1957.

References

1889 births
1957 deaths
Fine Gael TDs
Members of the 14th Dáil
Members of the 8th Seanad
Fine Gael senators